Cribrihabitans pelagius is a Gram-negative, strictly aerobic, chemoheterotrophic, rod-shaped and motile bacterium from the genus of Cribrihabitans which has been isolated from seawater from the beach of Najeong in Korea.

References

External links
Type strain of Cribrihabitans pelagius at BacDive -  the Bacterial Diversity Metadatabase

Rhodobacteraceae
Bacteria described in 2016